King's Highway or Kings Highway may refer to:

Roads

Australia
 Kings Highway (Australia), connecting Queanbeyan to Batemans Bay

Canada
 King's Highways, an alternative designation for the primary provincial highway system in Ontario
 King's Highway (French: Chemin du Roy), part of Route 138 in Quebec

United States

 Kings Highway (Brooklyn), a broad avenue passing through mostly commercial areas in the southern part of Brooklyn
 King's Highway (Charleston to Boston), United States
 (Old) King's Highway (Massachusetts Route 6A), Cape Cod, MA
 Old King's Highway Historic District, Barnstable, MA
 Brewster Old King's Highway Historic District, Brewster, MA
 Kings Highway (Dupont Avenue), Minneapolis, MN
 Kings Highway (Virginia State Route 3), central Virginia
 Kings Highway (Virginia State Route 125), Suffolk, Virginia
 Kings Highway (New Jersey Route 27), northern New Jersey
 Kings Highway (today County Route 13 (Rockland County, New York)), a major route through Valley Cottage, New York
 Kings Highway (today Farm to Market Road 989), in Bowie County, Texas
 Kings Highway (today Pennsylvania Route 143), in eastern Pennsylvania
 Kings Highway (today U.S. Route 61), the trail following the Mississippi River northward from New Orleans, Louisiana, through New Madrid, Sikeston, Cape Girardeau, Perryville, and St. Louis, Missouri

Historical roads
 King's Highway (ancient), an ancient trade route from Egypt to Syria mentioned in the Bible
 El Camino Real (California) (lit. "the King's Road"), a commemorative route

Places
 Kings Highway Conservation District, Dallas, Texas, a neighborhood

Railway stations 
New York City Subway stations:
Kings Highway (BMT Brighton Line) at East 16th Street; serving the 
Kings Highway (IND Culver Line) at McDonald Avenue; serving the 
Kings Highway (BMT Sea Beach Line) at West 8th Street; serving the 
 Church Street station (MBTA), known as Kings Highway during planning

Films and songs
 The King's Highway, a 1927 British film
 "Kings Highway," a song on Tom Petty and the Heartbreakers' album Into the Great Wide Open
 "King's Highway," a song by Kenny Wayne Shepherd album Trouble Is...

See also
King's Road (disambiguation)
Royal Road (disambiguation)
El Camino Real (disambiguation)
King's Way